Ecopipam (development codes SCH-39166, EBS-101, and PSYRX-101) is a dopamine antagonist which is under development for the treatment of Lesch-Nyhan syndrome, Tourette's syndrome, speech disorders, and restless legs syndrome. It is taken by mouth.

Ecopipam acts as a selective dopamine D1 and D5 receptor antagonist. It is orally active, has an elimination half-life of 10hours, crosses the blood–brain barrier, and substantially occupies brain dopamine receptors. Side effects of ecopipam may include depression, anxiety, fatigue, sedation, somnolence, insomnia, headaches, muscle twitching, and suicidal ideation, among others. It appears to lack the typical extrapyramidal effects like tardive dyskinesia that occur with D2 receptor antagonists.

Ecopipam is an experimental drug and has not been approved for medical use. As of April 2022, it is in phase 3 trials for Lesch-Nyhan syndrome, phase 2 trials for Tourette's syndrome and speech disorders, and phase 2/phase 1 trials for restless legs syndrome. The drug was also under development for the treatment of cocaine-related disorders, obesity, and schizophrenia, but development for these indications was discontinued.

Pharmacology

Pharmacodynamics
Ecopipam is a selective dopamine D1 and D5 receptor antagonist. It shows little affinity for either dopamine D2-like or 5-HT2 receptors.

Clinical trials
Based on its profile in animal models, ecopipam was first studied as a treatment for schizophrenia but showed no efficacy. Side effects including sedation, restlessness, vomiting, and anxiety were generally rated mild. There were no reports of Parkinsonian-like extrapyramidal symptoms typically seen with D2 antagonists.

Human clinical studies also showed that ecopipam was an effective antagonist of the acute euphoric effects of cocaine. However, the effect did not persist following repeated administration.

Researchers have postulated that dopamine via D1 receptors in the mesolimbic system is involved with rewarded behaviors and pleasure. One such behavior is eating, and ecopipam has been shown in a large clinical study to be an effective treatment for obesity. However, reports of mild-to-moderate, reversible anxiety and depression made it unsuitable for commercialization as an anti-obesity drug, and its development was stopped for that indication.

As of 2021, Emalex Biosciences is investigating its potential use for central nervous system disorders. Open-label studies have found ecopipam to reduce gambling behaviors in subjects with pathological gambling and to decrease the motor and vocal tics in adults with Tourette syndrome. A subsequent double-blind placebo-controlled study in pediatric subjects confirmed ecopipam's ability to ameliorate the motor and vocal symptoms seen in patients with Tourette's syndrome. Ecopipam is currently in a phase 2/3 clinical trial for the treatment of Tourette's syndrome in children ages 7 to 17.

Ecopipam is additionally under development for the treatment of Lesch–Nyhan syndrome (phase 3) and restless legs syndrome (phase 1/2).

Ecopipam is an investigational first-in-class drug being evaluated for the treatment of childhood-onset fluency disorder (stuttering) in adults. It is under development for the treatment of stuttering (phase 2). There are currently no U.S. Food and Drug Administration approved medications for the treatment of stuttering.

Chemistry
Chemically, ecopipam is a synthetic benzazepine derivative. It can be synthesized from a simple tetralin derivative:

References

1-Phenyl-2,3,4,5-tetrahydro-1H-3-benzazepines
Chloroarenes
Dopamine antagonists
Phenols